Catocala adultera is a moth in the family Erebidae first described by Édouard Ménétries in 1856. It is found in northern Europe, from Siberia to the Russian Far East (Altai, Ussuri, Amur) and Mongolia.

The larvae feed on Populus tremula.

References

adultera
Moths of Europe
Moths of Asia
Moths described in 1856